Beau Brieske (born April 5, 1998) is an American professional baseball pitcher for the Detroit Tigers of Major League Baseball (MLB).

Amateur career
Brieske attended Perry High School in Gilbert, Arizona, graduating in 2016. He spent two years playing college baseball at Glendale Community College before transferring to Colorado State University Pueblo for his junior season. As a junior, Brieske started 14 games in which he went 7–5 with a 5.42 ERA and 116 strikeouts over  innings. Following the season's end, he was selected by the Detroit Tigers in the 27th round of the 2019 Major League Baseball draft.

Professional career
Brieske signed with Detroit and made his professional debut with the Rookie-level Gulf Coast League Tigers and was promoted to the Lakeland Flying Tigers of the Class A-Advanced Florida State League to end the season. Over  innings between both teams, he went 3–1 with a 3.10 ERA. He did not play a minor league game in 2020 due to the cancellation of the season caused by the COVID-19 pandemic. Brieske began the 2021 season with the West Michigan Whitecaps of the High-A Central and was promoted to the Erie SeaWolves of the Double-A Northeast in late July. Over 21 starts between the two clubs, he pitched to a 9–4 record and 3.12 ERA with 116 strikeouts over  innings.

Brieske was assigned to the Toledo Mud Hens of the Triple-A International League to begin the 2022 season. After making two starts with Toledo, Brieske's contract was selected by the Tigers on April 22. He made his MLB debut for the Tigers as the starting pitcher on April 23, 2022, in a loss to the Colorado Rockies, pitching five innings in which he allowed three hits, three runs, two walks, and three strikeouts. Brieske earned his first major league win on June 11, throwing  scoreless innings in the Tigers' 3–1 victory over the Toronto Blue Jays. On July 21, Brieske was placed on the 15-day injured list with forearm soreness.

References

External links

CSU Pueblo bio

1998 births
Living people
Baseball players from Arizona
Sportspeople from Chandler, Arizona
Major League Baseball pitchers
Detroit Tigers players
Glendale Gauchos baseball players
CSU Pueblo ThunderWolves baseball players
Gulf Coast Tigers players
Lakeland Flying Tigers players
West Michigan Whitecaps players
Erie SeaWolves players
Toledo Mud Hens players